CFAV Firebrand (YTR 562) is a  in the Royal Canadian Navy designed by Robert Allan Ltd.
Firebrand is based in CFB Esquimalt, on Vancouver Island.
Her sister ship CFAV Firebird (YTR 561) was based in CFB Halifax and decommissioned in 2014.

Firebrand has three water cannons can fire water, supplemented by fire suppressant foam from her two 250 gallon tanks.
Her water cannons are capable of pumping a 19,000 litres per minute at 150 psi.
Although not operated as such, she can also serve as a tugboat, and has a bollard pull of 7.5 tons.

Design and construction
According to the Canadian American Strategic Review the class was designed by naval architects Robert Allan Limited, and were built at Vancouver Shipyards in North Vancouver in 1978, and later acquired by the Canadian Forces.

The ships were powered by two  azimuthing Z-drives and one hydraulic tunnel bow thruster. The ships had a crew of five firefighters.

The Fire class was equipped with three manually-controlled  water cannons, two diesel-driven fire pumps capable of expending 2,500 gpm at 150 psi each.

Service history
On 4 December 2012 the Department of National Defence published an enquiry for Canadian shipbuilders interested in building replacements for the Glen-class tugs¸ and Fire-class fireboats. A single class would replace both the tugs and the fireboats, and would be operated by civilian crews. The replacement vessels would have water cannons that could be controlled remotely, by a single individual.

References

Fleet of the Royal Canadian Navy
Fire-class fireboats
Auxiliary ships of the Royal Canadian Navy